Jefferson Community and Technical College (JCTC) is a public community college in Louisville, Kentucky.  It is part of the Kentucky Community and Technical College System and the largest college in that system. JCTC was formed on July 1, 2005 by the consolidation of Jefferson Community College and Jefferson Technical College. Jefferson Community College was originally chartered in 1968 and Jefferson Technical College (originally Jefferson County State Vocational-Technical School and later Kentucky TECH, Jefferson Campus) was chartered in 1953. JCTC is accredited by the Southern Association of Colleges and Schools (SACS).

Students

In the Fall 2016 semester, Jefferson's total headcount was 11,982 students. The student body is 55.4% female, 43.3% male with 1.3% undisclosed.  Minority enrollment included 19% African-American students (who declare ethnicity). There are 40 different languages spoken on campus.

Service area

The primary service area of JCTC includes:

 Bullitt County
 Carroll County
 Gallatin County
 Henry County
 Jefferson County
 Nelson County
 Oldham County
 Owen County
 Shelby County
 Spencer County
 Trimble County

Tuition

Out-of-state students covered by the tuition reciprocity agreements will pay the in-state rate. These Indiana counties include: Clark, Crawford, Floyd, Harrison, Scott, Washington, Jefferson, Switzerland, Ohio, Ripley, Jennings, and Dearborn.
Out-of-state students covered by tuition contiguous agreements will pay the out-of-state (contiguous counties) rate. These Indiana counties include: Perry, Posey, Spencer, and Warrick.
In-state tuition rates apply to online courses.

Programs

Jefferson offers more than 5 options in academic and technical programs. and Educational Enrichment Services (EES).

Educational Enrichment Services (EES)

EES provides – at no cost – a review of fundamentals in math, writing, or reading skills for students whose COMPASS scores are too low for enrollment in regular JCTC classes.

A joint program of JCTC and JCPS Adult and Continuing Education, EES (pronounced "ease") classes meet during the fall and spring semesters on both the Downtown and Southwest JCTC campuses. Besides a review of fundamentals, EES instructors also teach basic computer skills, discuss study strategies, and provide information about campus resources. Students who complete EES are better prepared for the transition into JCTC developmental or credit courses.

Degrees

Associate Degree
The associate degree traditionally takes a full-time student two years or four to five semesters to complete.  To earn the associate degree, students must successfully complete about 60 to 77 credit hours, depending on the program. Associate degrees include transfer degrees, and technical/professional degrees, many of which can also transfer to four-year programs.

Diploma
The diploma is designed to prepare students for employment in a specific technical field in one to two years. To earn a diploma, students must successfully complete 36 to 68 credit hours. Diplomas are offered in fields such as surgery technology and automotive technology.

Certificates
A certificate can be earned in as little as one semester, depending on the program. Other certificates may require multiple semesters. Certificates are offered primarily in technical programs. Certificates often can be earned one at a time, building towards a degree program, or can be earned in addition to a degree or diploma. Some certificate programs prepare students to take industry certification exams.

Campuses
JCTC has six campuses, all in Kentucky. Three are in the Louisville Metro governmental area and three are in other counties:
 Louisville campuses:
 Downtown (Downtown Louisville)
 Jefferson Technical (Downtown Louisville)
 Southwest (Valley Station)
 Outlying campuses:
 Carrollton, Carrollton
 Shelby County, Shelbyville
 Bullitt County, Shepherdsville

The largest campus is the Downtown Campus at Second and Broadway in Downtown Louisville, which enrolls more than 7,200 students a year. A second campus, Jefferson Technical Campus, is just seven blocks west and is home to many of the college's technical and trades programs. The Southwest Campus is located in southwestern Jefferson County, just off the Gene Snyder Expressway. The Southwest Campus is home to the college's Technology and Related Sciences program. Jefferson's newest campus is in Bullitt County and prepares students to transfer to university or to the college's technical programs. The Carrollton Campus has programs in Practical Nursing, Industrial Chemical Technology, and Industrial Maintenance Technology, as well as the Associate in Arts and Associate in Science transfer degrees. The Shelby County Campus has programs in Practical Nursing, Industrial Maintenance Technology and Machine Tool Technology, as well as the Associate in Arts and Associate in Science transfer degrees.

In 2010, the Jefferson Community & Technical College completed construction of the new $25.6 million state-of-the-art Health Sciences Building at Second and Chestnut Street at its Downtown Louisville Campus. It is a four-story,  instructional building for allied health programs. The project includes a small clinic, laboratory space, library, a conference center, faculty offices, and student and teacher lounges.

See also
Metro-College

References

External links
 Official website

Kentucky Community and Technical College System
Universities and colleges in Louisville, Kentucky
Educational institutions established in 2005
Universities and colleges accredited by the Southern Association of Colleges and Schools
2005 establishments in Kentucky